Reverberation is the persistence of sound after the sound is produced.

Reverb may also refer to:

 Reverb effect, a means of artificially applying reverberation to sound

 Reverb (non-profit), environmental organization that educates and engages musicians and their fans
 Reverb (TV series), a TV series on music that airs on the US cable network HBO
 Reverb, Stanford Isaac Rhodes IV's car in Hot Wheels Battle Force 5
 Reverb.com, an online marketplace to buy and sell music gear

Reverberation may refer to:
 Reverberation (album), an album by Echo & the Bunnymen
 Reverberation (record label), a record label
 "Reverberation (Doubt)", a song by Texas psychedelic rock band The 13th Floor Elevators